Vice Admiral Sir Geoffrey William Roger Biggs,  (23 November 1938 – 29 June 2002) was a senior Royal Navy officer who served as Deputy Commander-in-Chief Fleet from 1992 to 1995.

Early life and family
Biggs was born on 23 November 1938, the son of Lieutenant Commander (later Vice Admiral Sir) Hilary Biggs and Florence Biggs ( Backhouse) and grandson of Admiral of the Fleet Sir Roger Backhouse. He was educated at Charterhouse and the Royal Naval College, Dartmouth.

In 1967, Biggs married Marcia Leask; they had three sons. Following the dissolution of his first marriage, he married Caroline Kerr (née Daly) in 1981; they had one daughter.

Naval career
Biggs joined the Royal Navy in 1958 and qualified as a submariner. He went on to command the submarine  and then the frigate . In the late 1970s he also commanded the submarine  patrolling the Barents Sea above Norway. He was appointed Commanding Officer of the frigate  and Captain of the 2nd Frigate Squadron in 1985, Director of Naval Operations and Trade under the Naval Staff at the Ministry of Defence in 1986 and Director of Naval Staff Duties in 1987. His last appointments were as Flag Officer Gibraltar in 1990 and Deputy Commander-in-Chief Fleet in 1992 before retiring in 1995.

Biggs was appointed a Knight Commander of the Order of the Bath in the 1993 New Year Honours.

Later life
In retirement Biggs worked for International Computers Limited. He died on 29 June 2002, aged 63.

References

1938 births
2002 deaths
Knights Commander of the Order of the Bath
People educated at Charterhouse School
Royal Navy vice admirals